Clay High School is a four-year high school located in Green Cove Springs, Florida. It is a part of the Clay County School District.

Name
As Clay High School is named after the county it is located in, Clay County, it is indirectly named for Henry Clay, Sr.  Clay was a dominant figure in both the First Party System to 1824, and the Second Party System after that. Known as "The Great Compromiser" and "The Great Pacifier" for his ability to bring others to agreement, he was the founder and leader of the Whig Party and a leading advocate of programs for modernizing the economy, especially tariffs to protect industry, a national bank, and internal improvements to promote canals, ports and railroads.

Clay County
Clay High School was the first high school in Clay County. Prior to the construction of other high schools in the county during the mid-20th century, Clay High School served every city in the county, including Keystone Heights, Green Cove Springs, Orange Park, Penny Farms, and all the unincorporated towns in the county.

Original location
Clay High School was located at the Green Cove Springs Junior High, but now it has been moved to a much larger building off of SR 16, about 2 miles from the original school.

Notable alumni
Cliff Avril - defensive end for the Seattle Seahawks, NFL
Kyle Bird - pitcher, MLB
Frank J. Canova (born 1956) - inventor of the smartphone.
Nolan Carroll, Jr - former defensive back, NFL
Caeleb Dressel - American record holder, world record holder, Olympic swimmer
Dane Dunning - MLB Pitcher for the Texas Rangers
Will Holden - offensive linemen for Arizona Cardinals, NFL

References

External links
Clay High School homepage
GreatSchools.net profile

High schools in Clay County, Florida
Public high schools in Florida